Clinge is a village in the Dutch province of Zeeland. It is a part of the municipality of Hulst, and lies about 28 km southwest of Bergen op Zoom. Clinge is located on the Dutch-Belgian border and joins with the Belgian town of De Klinge, in the Belgian municipality of Sint-Gillis-Waas. This border can normally be crossed freely.

History 
The village was first mentioned in the 13th century as die clinc, and means hill. Clinge is a linear settlement. The moorland was cultivated in the 13th century and poldered in 1616. In 1830, it was cut off from its Belgian part and became an independent parish in 1875.

The Catholic St Henricus Church was built in 1875 and is a three-aisled basilica like church. The tower was restored in 1973.

Clinge was home to 692 people in 1840. It was an independent municipality until 1970 when it was merged into Hulst.

Gallery

References

Populated places in Zeeland
Former municipalities of Zeeland
Belgium–Netherlands border crossings
Hulst